InTouch is a quality control company based in Shenzhen, China. The company has been reported to provide quality control services in factories across China to several foreign firms.

Background
InTouch was founded by an American citizen, Andrew Reich in Shenzhen, in 2008. Reich grew up in Long Island, New York, had been working in a quality control firm in Shenzhen since 2003. During this time, he observed many industrial issues arising from integrity and communication in the QC sector, which led him to start this company with the help of a few American investors.

As a quality control firm, InTouch visits factories across China to inspect merchandise and analyse production facilities for quality and consistency. The company claims its clients include some of America's largest house-ware and cookware brands.

References

External links
 Official website

Companies of China